Denisovskaya is a rural locality (a village) in Spasskoye Rural Settlement, Tarnogsky District, Vologda Oblast, Russia. The population was 108 as of 2002.

Geography 
Denisovskaya is located 27 km northwest of Tarnogsky Gorodok (the district's administrative centre) by road. Krivosheinskaya is the nearest rural locality.

References 

Rural localities in Tarnogsky District